D1NZ is a production car drifting series in New Zealand, a sanctioned championship under Motorsport New Zealand, the official FIA appointed governing body of motor-racing in New Zealand. It began early in 2003 as a small competition consisting of several drifting teams from all over the country in order to organise and regulate Drifting events in the country. Since then it has continued to grow larger and more professional, now involving professional teams and internationally ranked drivers.

The series consists of two national title competitions, the D1NZ Pro Championship and the D1NZ Pro-Sport Series. New competitors generally need to prove themselves in the Pro-Sport Series before progressing into the pro class, unless competing with an equivalent international licence. Organizers aim to promote and educate Drifting in New Zealand, with a regulated safe environment. Despite similar moniker, the series is not related to the Japanese D1 Grand Prix series. It has been recognised as the longest running drifting series in the world.

The Category has traditionally formed a five round national competition with a mixture of tight & technical courses and faster, full throttle race circuits. In 2019 the Pro-Championship tour includes Wellington's Max Motors Speedway, Trustpower Baypark in Tauranga, Manfeild Circuit Chris Amon, Hampton Downs Motorsport Park and Pukekohe Park Raceway

Competition format

Drivers compete in a Qualifying session for each event, their qualifying position determines their grid position in a Top-32 or Top-24 seeded battle tree. Each driver receives 2 qualifying passes in a shootout style format, with a marble draw used for the grid order. Each competitor is scored by three judging officials for each pass.

A maximum of 100 points will be allocated by the Judges to a competitor for each Pass in accordance with the following criteria:

 Line: 35/100
 Angle: 35/100
 Style: 30/100

The highest Qualifier shall be the driver with the highest aggregate score from all judges. The judging criteria consist of a racing line set out by the judges, marked by clipping points or clipping areas.

The main competition of each D1NZ event sees the drivers compete through their seeded battle tree in an elimination battle. Competitors are seeded with the top ranked driver drawn against the lowest ranked driver, the second highest ranked driver drawn against the second lowest ranked driver and so on. The number of seeds is based on the size of the field. Each battle consists of two passes, a lead and a chase run for each driver. The winner of each elimination battle is the driver judged successful from both passes, or any re-run battle and advances to the next bracket (Top32, Top16, Top 8, Top 4 etc) The remainder are eliminated from competition. The Top 4 (semi-finals) battle winners shall contest for a place in the round final battle, with the unsuccessful drivers contesting for third and fourth.

The objective for each driver is to set or better their performance in qualifying during their lead run. The driver in the chase position must also set or better their qualifying performance, but use the leading car as a mobile clipping point around the course, aiming to position their car as close as possible to the leading vehicle while fulfilling the competition criteria set out by the judges.

List of Pro-Series Champions

List of Pro-Sport Champions
Formally referred to as Pro-Am from the 2010 - '11 season until its name change in 2015 - '16 to Pro-Sport.

See also
 Drifting (motorsport)
 D1 Grand Prix
 Formula D

References

External links
Official website
Official sponsor

Drifting series
D1 Grand Prix
D1 New Zealand
All articles to be expanded